This is a list of psychiatric hospitals and nursing homes in India.

Assam
 Lokopriya Gopinath Bordoloi Regional Institute of Mental Health (LGBRIMH), Tezpur

Delhi

Haryana

Jharkhand

Government Psychiatric Hospital 

 Central Institute of Psychiatry, Kanke Road, Ranchi
 Ranchi Institute of Neuro-Psychiatry & Allied Sciences
 Raj Artemis Heart Center, Ranchi

Private Psychiatric Hospital 

 Davis Institute of Neuropsychiatry

Maharashtra

Government Psychiatric Hospitals
 Yerwada Mental Hospital, Pune 
Regional mental hospital, Nagpur, Maharashtra.
Government mental hospital, Thane, Maharashtra.
Government mental hospital, Ratnagiri, Maharashtra.

Private hospitals in Maharashtra 
Mindcare Hospital for Mental and Sexual Health, Ratnagiri, Pune and Navi Mumbai

Crossroad Wellness

Karnataka

Government Psychiatric Hospitals
 National Institute of Mental Health and Neurosciences, Bangalore
 Dharwad Institute of Mental Health and Neurosciences, Dharwad
Private Medical Colleges & Hospitals
  Father Muller Medical College & Mental Health Centre, Kankanady, Mangalore
 The Mind Research Foundation, Bangalore
 Cadabams Rehabilitation Centre, Bangalore
 Spandana Institute of Mental Health and Neuro Sciences (SIMHANS), Bangalore
 Manasa Hospital, Jayanagar, Bangalore
 Abhaya Hospital, Hosur Road, Bangalore
 KMC Hospital, Manipal
 K.S Hegde Hospital, Mangalore

Kerala
Government psychiatric hospitals

 Government Mental Health Center, Oolampara, Trivandrum.
 Government Mental health centre - Thrissur
 Government Mental health centre - Kuthiravattom, Kozhikode
Kuthiravattam Hospital, Kozhikode, Kerala
Government Ayurveda Research Institute for Mental Diseases, Kottakkal, Kerala
Private Psychiatric Hospitals

 Mindful Rejuvenation,karukutty,Kochi, Ernakulam
Kusumagiri Mental Health Centre,Kochi

Madhya Pradesh

Government Psychiatric Hospitals
 Mental Hospital, Indore
 Mental Hospital, Gwalior

Private Clinic
 Dr. R.N SAHU
 Dr. Rahul Mathur (Svadhyay Neuropsychiatric Hospital, Indore)

Punjab
Dr. Vidyasagar Institute of Mental Health, Amritsar

Private Nursing Home
MindPlus Retreat, Doraha, Ludhiana
 Mind Plus, Ludhiana
 Life Line Foundations, Patiala
 MindOn, Ludhiana

Tamil Nadu
Athma Hospitals and Research Pvt. Ltd, Trichy
Christian Medical College, Vellore
Schizophrenia research Foundation Chennai (SCARF)
Ahana Hospitals
Institute of Mental health, Chennai
 The Banyan (NGO)
 Serene Life Hospital)
 Naveen Hospital Coimbatore
Manashasthra Integrated Mind Care 
Beautiful Minds Women & Child psychiatric clinic
 Revamp Hospital)

Uttar Pradesh
 King George Medical University, Lucknow
 Dr Rakesh Kumar Paswan neuropsychiatry centre at Muir Road near Rajapur traffic churaha (dwivedi medical and research centre) Allahabad.
 Institute of Mental Health and Hospital, Agra
 Mental Hospital, Bareilly

Uttrakhand

Government Psychiatric Hospitals
 State Mental Health Institute, Dehradun

West Bengal

State-run Mental Hospitals
 Calcutta Pavlov Hospital 18, Gobra Road,Kolkata
 Institute of Psychiatry 7, D.L. Khan Road,Kolkata
 Berhampore Mental Hospital, PO- Berhampur, Dist-Murshidabad
 Institute for Mental Care PO+ Dist- Purulia 03252-223435
 Toofangunj Mental, Hospital, PO-Toofangunj, Dist-Coochbehar
 Lumbini park mental hospital, Kolkata

Private Mental Hospitals and Nursing Homes

 Rekindle Wellness Psychiatric Centre, Kolkata.
 Antaragram, Baruipur, Kolkata
 Mon Private Nursing Home, Kolkata
 Mind Care Clinic, Kolkata

References

Mental health organisations in India
Psychiatric